The 2022–23 Fordham Rams men's basketball team represented Fordham University during the 2022–23 NCAA Division I men's basketball season. The Rams, led by first-year head coach Keith Urgo, played their home games at Rose Hill Gymnasium in The Bronx, New York as a member of the Atlantic 10 Conference. This was the Rams' first 20-win season since the 1990–91 season.

Previous season
The Rams finished the 2021–22 season 16–16, 8–10 in A-10 play to finish in eighth place. They defeated George Washington in the second round of the A-10 tournament before losing to Davidson in the quarterfinals.

On April 20, 2022, following the retirement of Villanova head coach Jay Wright, head coach Kyle Neptune left the school to become the head coach of the Wildcats. On April 26, the school named associate head coach Keith Urgo the team's new head coach.

Offseason

Departures

Incoming transfers

Recruiting classes

2022 recruiting class

2023 recruiting class

Roster

Schedule and results

|-
!colspan=9 style=| Non-conference regular season

|-
!colspan=9 style=| Atlantic 10 regular season

|-
!colspan=9 style=| Atlantic 10 tournament

Source

References

Fordham
Fordham Rams men's basketball seasons
Fordham
Fordham